Blachia is a genus of plants under the family Euphorbiaceae first described as a genus in 1858. It is native to Southeast Asia, southern China, and the Indian Subcontinent.

Species

Formerly included
moved to other genera: Strophioblachia, Trigonostemon 
 Blachia glandulosa - Strophioblachia fimbricalyx 
 Blachia viridissima - Trigonostemon viridissimus

Gallery

References

Codiaeae
Euphorbiaceae genera
Taxa named by Henri Ernest Baillon